is a Japanese musical arranger and keyboardist in distributors Being Inc.

Biography
In 1990s Ikeda entered to Being Inc. agency where he provided arrangement and strings arrangement for several of famous artist including Zard, Deen, Field of View or Mi-ke. Ikeda was also involved with arranging famous Anime song Moonlight Densetsu by Dali under alias name Ikeda Daisuke (池田大輔).

In 2000s he entered to Giza Studio where he provided arrangements for minor artist as Miho Komatsu. In 2002 he appeared on final live of Field of View as strings arranger.

During 2000s period he composed original soundtracks for several Anime television series such as a Fighting Beauty Wulong or Saiyuki Reload.

In years 2008-2013 he regularly appeared Garnet Crow live concerts as a string arranger, on final live he provided special arrangement on song Sora ni Hanabi wo. In May 2016, Ikeda participated in Zard's live tour session "25th Anniversary Live" as a keyboardist. DVD footage was released on December.

He's active as of 2019.

List of provided works as arranger
★ album ☆ single/coupling

Mi-Ke
Suki sa, Suki sa ☆
Kimi ni Aitai ★
Nagai Kami no Shoujo ★
Ano Toki Kimi wa Wakakatta ★
Blue Moon no you ni ☆
Surfin Japan ☆ 
Kanashiki Teddy Boy ☆

Zard
Sayonara Ienakute, Ai wa Nemutteru (Hold Me) ★
Konna ni Soba ni Iru no ni (album version) ☆
Kiraku ni Ikou, I'm In love (Forever You) ★
Kokoro wo Hiraite ☆
Dan Dan Kokoro Hikareteku, Nemuri, Today Is Another Day (Today is Another Day) ★
My Baby Grand ~Nukumori ga Hoshikute~ ☆
Good day
Unmei no Roulette Mawashite ☆
Motto Chikaku de Kimi no Yokogao Mitetai ☆

T-Bolan
Be Myself

Yumiko Morishita
Koi to Rikutsu (Kick Off!) ★

Aiko Yanagihara
Don't let me down ☆
Kitto Futari Aete Yokatta ☆

Deen
Sugao de Waratteitai ☆
Kimi ga Inai Natsu ☆
Yume de Aru youni ☆
Tooi Sora ☆
Kimi Sae Ireba ☆
DEEN Classics One WHITE Christmas time ★
Nichiyoubi ★
Itsuka Boku no Ude no Naka de ☆
Sayonara mo Iwanaide Rain ☆
Umi no Mieru Machi ☆
Go with you ☆
Ame no Roppongi ☆
Circle ★

B'z
Love Me, I Love You ☆
Love Phantom ☆
Mienai Chikara (Invisible One)/Move ☆
Calling ☆
Banzai ☆
Ocean ☆
Lonely Stars ☆
Super Love Song ☆

Dali
Moonlight Densetsu ☆

Manish
Kimi no Sora ni Naritai ☆

Wands
Secret Night: It's my treat ☆
Sabitsuita Machine Gun de Kimi wo Uchinukou ☆

Miho Komatsu
My destination ☆
Anata ga Iru kara ☆
Yakusoku no Umi (Miho Komatsu 5 : source) ★
Rakuen, Last Letter (Miho Komatsu 6th : Hanano) ★
Jaa ne, Sore Jaa ne (Miho Komatsu 7 : prime number) ★
Namida no Ato ni (Miho Komatsu 8 : a piece of cake) ★

Field of View
Mayowanaide ☆
Kitto Hanareteitemo, Moonlight, Tomadoi no Kisetsu (Field of View I) ★
Promise you, Kimi no Koe ga Kikitakute (Field of View II) ★
Meguru Kisetsu wo Koete ☆
Kimi wo Terasu Taiyou ni ☆
Kaze yo, everywhere, Natural, Omoidasu yo Kimi no Egao wo, Nagareru Kumo, I'm thinking a lot of you (Field of View III ~Now Here No Where~)★
Crash ☆
Natsu no Katasumi de, Kimi, Sunday Morning, Juunigatsu no Mahou Time is gone (Lovely Jubbly) ★
Fuyu no Ballade ☆
Beautiful Day ☆
Kiseki no Hana, Sayonara to Aozora, Kodou (Capsule Monster) ★

Chigiri Akiyoshi
Muryoku ☆

Mai Kuraki
Fushigi no Kuni (Fairy Tale) ★
Ashita e Kakeru Hashi ☆
Shiroi Yuki ☆

Aiko Kitahara
Omoide ni Sukuwaretemo ☆

Aiuchi Rina
Kaze no Nai Umi de Dakishimete ☆
Kuuki ☆

Breakerz
Winter Bell ☆

Renka
Yume Hirari ☆

List of composed Anime television soundtracks
Complete list of provided anime soundtracks.
Secret of Cerulean Sand
Project ARMS
Cheeky Angel
Detective School Q
Saiyuki Reload
Monkey Turn
Saiyuki Gunlock
MÄR
Fighting Beauty Wulong
Golgo 13
Young Black Jack

References

External links
Official Blog (powered by WordPress)
Daisuke Ikeda Twitter Profile
Daisuke Ikeda profile on IMDb
Daisuke Ikeda on VGMDB

Being Inc. artists
Japanese music arrangers
Japanese keyboardists
Living people
1964 births
People from Yamaguchi Prefecture